Big Rock Falls is a waterfall in Western North Carolina, United States, located on private property on Little Pisgah Mountain near Fairview, Buncombe County, North Carolina.

Little Pisgah Mountain 
Little Pisgah Mountain contains several creeks and tributaries that flow into Garren Creek.  Big Rock Falls is fed by a tributary on the northwest side of the mountain.

Visiting the falls 
The mountain and the falls are located on private property whose owners do not permit public access.

Nearby falls 
There is a smaller, cascading waterfall about 500 yards southeast and uphill from Big Rock Falls.  Rainbow Falls (Rutherford County) is approximately 15 miles from Big Rock Falls.

Other falls in the region include:
 Looking Glass Falls
 Setrock Creek Falls
 Hooker Falls
 High Falls (DuPont State Forest)

References 

Waterfalls of Transylvania County, North Carolina
Waterfalls of North Carolina
Tourist attractions in Transylvania County, North Carolina